Dzerzhynskyi is an urban-type settlement in the Dovzhansk Raion of the Luhansk Oblast of Ukraine. Population: 

In 2016 the settlement was renamed Liubymivka as part of decommunization in Ukraine. The settlement's name change process is temporarily suspended as it is not controlled by the government of Ukraine.

References

Urban-type settlements in Dovzhansk Raion